Douglas Jackson (December 12, 1924 – April 26, 1980) was a Canadian professional ice hockey goaltender who played six games in the National Hockey League with the Chicago Black Hawks during the 1947–48 NHL season. Jackson served in the Canadian Army from 1944 to 1945.

External links

1924 births
1980 deaths
Canadian ice hockey goaltenders
Canadian military personnel of World War II
Chicago Blackhawks players
Ice hockey people from Winnipeg

References